AMG may refer to:

Automobiles 
 AB Motorfabriken i Göteborg, a former Swedish automobile manufacturer
 Mercedes-AMG, a division of Mercedes-Benz
 AM General

Mathematics and science 
 Algebraic multigrid method for solving differential equations
 Amagat (abbreviated amg), a unit of number density of molecules
 Auxiliary metabolic genes
 Glucan 1,4-a-glucosidase

Media and entertainment
 Academy Music Group, a UK music venue operator
 Access Media Group, Canada
 All Music Guide, an entertainment review site
 Alpha Male Gorillas, a band in New York, US
 AMG (rapper), a rapper
 AMGTV, a US television network
 Arab Media Group, Dubai
 Athletic Model Guild, of male models
 All Media Guide, a former music, movie and game database company acquired by RhythmOne

Other uses 
 Allied Military Government for Occupied Territories (originally abbreviated AMGOT, later AMG), military rule administered by Allied forces during and after World War II within European territories they occupied
 AMG International, a Christian missions organization
 Arzneimittelgesetz, German law about drugs

See also
 OMG (disambiguation)
 Oh My God (disambiguation), also spelled as "Ah My God"
 Oh My Goddess (disambiguation), also spelled as "Ah My Goddess"